Julio Peralta and Horacio Zeballos were the defending champions but chose not to defend their title.

Tim Pütz and Jan-Lennard Struff won the title after defeating Guido Andreozzi and Ariel Behar 7–6(7–5), 7–6(10–8) in the final.

Seeds

Draw

References
 Main Draw

AON Open Challenger - Doubles
2017 Doubles
AON